= Alyaksandr Krakushyn =

Belarusian footballer

Personal information
- Date of birth: 15 March 1991 (age 35)
- Position: Goalkeeper

Youth career
- 2008: Dinamo Minsk
- 2009–2010: Torpedo Zhodino

Senior career*
Years	Team	Apps	(Gls)
2009–2010	Torpedo Zhodino	1	(0)
- * Club domestic league appearances and goals as of 31 December 2010

Alyaksandr Krakushyn (Belarusian: Аляксандр Кракушын; Russian: Александр Крякушин; born 15 March 1991) is a retired Belarusian professional football player. He had to retire from professional football in late 2010 at the age of 19 due to health issues.
